Adarsh Nagar is a neighborhood in Visakhapatnam, Andhra Pradesh, India.

Adarsh Nagar may also refer to:

Adarsh Nagar, Delhi (Vidhan Sabha constituency)
Adarsh Nagar, Rajasthan (Vidhan Sabha constituency)
Adarsh Nagar metro station, New Delhi, India
Adarsh Nagar (Mumbai) metro station, Mumbai, Maharashtra, India
Adarsh Nagar railway station, part of Delhi Suburban Railway, India